Deggenhausertal is a municipality in the district of Bodensee in Baden-Württemberg in Germany.



Geography
Deggenhausertal is located in two hilly valleys between the mountains of Gehrenberg and Höchsten. It is bordered to the west by Heiligenberg and Salem, to the south by Bermatingen, Markdorf and Oberteuringen, to the east by the District of Ravensburg and its communes of Horgenzell and Wilhelmsdorf, and to the northwest by the commune of Illmensee in the District of Sigmaringen.

The commune contains 6 municipalities and several villages:

History

Historically Deggenhausertal was located in the border region between the Free Cities of Überlingen and Ravensburg, the Prince-Bishopric of Constance, Salem Abbey and the County of Heiligenberg. The different municipalities belonged to different feudal owners. By 1779 Deggenhausen, Homberg, Untersiggingen and Wittenhofen had come under the rule of the Princes of Fürstenberg; Roggenbeuren belonged to the cathedral chapter of Constance and Urnau to Salem Abbey.

In the Reichsdeputationshauptschluss of 1803, in which the principalities of the ecclesiastic rulers were dispersed to the counts and princes of the empire, Roggenbeuren and Urnau were disbursed to the Electorate of Baden. During the formation of the Confederation of the Rhine in 1806, the principality of Fürstenberg was mediatised and the other four municipalities were also annexed by Baden.

The 6 municipalities were separate communes until 1 January 1972 when they were united to form the larger conglomerate Deggenhausertal.

Coat of arms

References 

Bodenseekreis